Christian Alberto Riffo González (born 2 March 1977), sometimes referred as Cristian Riffo or Christian Alberto in Indonesia, is a Chilean former professional footballer who played as a midfielder for clubs in Chile and Indonesia.

Career
A product of Universidad de Chile youth system, he made ten appearances for the club in 1996 in the top division, where he coincided with players such as Leonardo Rodríguez, Luis Musrri, Víctor Hugo and Cristián Castañeda, among others. Then, he switched to Magallanes in 1997 in the second level.

In Chile, he also played for both Deportes Temuco (2003) and Deportes Puerto Montt (2004–05) in the top division and for Unión La Calera (2006) in the second division, where he coincided with players such as Víctor Rivero and Ariel Pereyra.

Abroad, he played in Indonesia for PSDS Deli Serdang in 2007–08.

After football
Riffo has went on playing football at amateur level in clubs such as Deportivo Independiente from Santiago.

References

External links
 
 Christian Riffo at FootballDatabase.eu 
 

1977 births
Living people
Footballers from Santiago
Chilean footballers
Chilean expatriate footballers
Universidad de Chile footballers
Deportes Magallanes footballers
Deportes Temuco footballers
Puerto Montt footballers
Unión La Calera footballers
Magallanes footballers
PSDS Deli Serdang players
Chilean Primera División players
Primera B de Chile players
Chilean expatriate sportspeople in Indonesia
Expatriate footballers in Indonesia
Association football midfielders